No Promises may refer to:

Music

Albums 
 No Promises (Carla Bruni album) (2007)
 No Promises (Icehouse album) (1997)

Songs 
 "No Promises" (Bryan Rice song), a 2005 song from the soundtrack of Nynne, covered by Shayne Ward in 2006
 "No Promises" (Cheat Codes song), a 2017 song by Cheat Codes featuring Demi Lovato
 "No Promises" (Icehouse song), (1985)
 "No Promises", by Shawn Mendes from the album Illuminate
 "No Promises", by A Boogie wit da Hoodie from the album The Bigger Artist

See also 
 Promise (disambiguation)